"The Riddle Song", also known as "I Gave My Love a Cherry", is an English folk song, a lullaby carried over by settlers to the American Appalachians.

History

"The Riddle Song" descends from a 15th-century English song in which a maiden says she is advised to unite with her lover. It is related to Child Ballad no. 1, or "Riddles Wisely Expounded" and Child Ballad no. 46, "Captain Wedderburn's Courtship"  It is no. 330 in the Roud Folk Song Index. Burl Ives recorded it on 11 February 1941 for his first album, Okeh Presents the Wayfaring Stranger. Since then, it has been recorded by many artists, including Josh White, Pete Seeger, Joan Baez, Doc Watson, Sam Cooke, Tennessee Ernie Ford, Shelby Flint, The Meters, Skid Roper and Carly Simon.

The song's "cherry that has no stone" goes back to the 15th-century version's "the cherye with-outyn ony ston."  Some have seen it as a reference to the hymen, and some have even tried to reconstruct an original bawdy version from which modern versions are supposedly bowdlerized.  However, the relevant slang sense of "cherry" is not attested till the early 20th century.  The other riddles in the original do not resemble the "reconstructions."

Popular culture
The song was sung by African American blues and folk musician Josh White in the 1949 John Sturges film "The Walking Hills."

It was sung by Ann-Margret in the 1961 Frank Capra film Pocketful of Miracles.

Canadian singer and actress Rebecca Jenkins recorded a live version of the song, entitled "I Gave my Love a Cherry," that appears on the El Seven Niteclub album featuring Big Sugar (band) (1993).

A parody was recorded by Jewish comedian Allan Sherman in a medley called "Shticks and Stones", on his album, My Son, the Folk Singer (1962).

A parody by Welsh comedian and folk singer Max Boyce, called "I Gave My Love a Debenture", features on his album, We All Had Doctors' Papers (1975).

The song was sung by Stephen Bishop in the toga party scene in the movie National Lampoon's Animal House (1978).

The song appeared in the "Marge vs. the Monorail" episode of The Simpsons, where Homer briefly serenaded Marge with a line: "I gave my love a chicken, it had no bones. Mmm... chicken."

The tune was adapted for the song "The Twelfth of Never".

The Jukebox Band sing it in a Shining Time Station episode, "Do I Hear".

The song was sung by the character Carlos (played by Mark Damon Espinoza) to Kelly Bundy in the Season Ten episode of Married... with Children entitled "Love Conquers Al". (1995)

A music student sings it in Baby Huey's Great Easter Adventure (1999).

Three lines are in Megas XLR episode 2, titled "Battle Royale" (2004).

In "Love & Monsters", an episode of the second series of the revived Doctor Who, the song is performed acoustically by Bliss (Kathryn Drysdale), a member of the group LINDA.

The song is sung by an asylum prisoner in Harlots, season 3, episode 2 (2019).

The tune is set in the second movement of composer Evan Chamber’s chamber piece “Come Down Heavy” for Violin, Alto Saxophone, and Piano. The title of the movement is “I gave my love a cherry”.

References

Burl Ives songs
Joan Baez songs
Pete Seeger songs
Doc Watson songs
Sam Cooke songs
Carly Simon songs
Year of song unknown
English folk songs